Jonathan Erlich and Andy Ram were the defending champions but they lost in the Quarterfinals to the eventual Champions Colin Fleming and Ross Hutchins who defeated Jamie Delgado and Ken Skupski in an all British final, 6–4, 6–3.

Seeds

Draw

Draw

References
 Main Draw

Aegon International - Doubles
2012 Men's Doubles